Qamıllı is a rural locality (a derevnya) in Qaybıç District, Tatarstan. The population was 59 as of 2010.

Geography 

History 
The village was established in 1927.

After the creation of districts in Tatar ASSR (Tatarstan) in Qaybıç (Ölcän in 1927) (1927–1944), Külle İl (1944–1956), Qaybıç (1956–1963), Bua (1963–1964),  Apas (1964–1991) and Qaybıç districts.

References

External links 
 

Rural localities in Kaybitsky District